Ayi Ganpat Tendulkar (1904–1975) was an Indian screenwriter, journalist and actor. He is especially known as the husband of Thea von Harbou, the writer of the science fiction film classic Metropolis.

Education and marriages

Tendulkar received the Toppiwala scholarship, which allowed him to gain admission into a British university, but he was not quite ready to begin his studies.  As a result, he decided to study French at the École Normale Superieure, in Paris.

Tendulkar's first wife was Sasha Alexandra Passini, a Russian whom he met in Paris in 1924. After they separated, Passini married an Italian man.

Tendulkar then married German actress Eva Schubring, the daughter of one of his professors. Their marriage ended once Tendulkar began a romantic relationship with the filmmaker Thea von Harbou, who was married to Fritz Lang. Their relationship was part of the motivation for von Harbou's divorce from  Lang.

Tendulkar's fourth wife was Indumati Gunaji. They met in India when both were involved in Gandhi's campaign against British rule. Their daughter, Laxmi Tendulkar Dhaul, wrote a book about her parents and von Harbou.

References

1904 births
1975 deaths
Indian actors
20th-century Indian journalists